Uwe Wünsch (born 15 February 1963 in Frankenberg, Saxony) is an East German cross-country skier who competed in the early 1980s. He won a bronze medal in the 4  × 10 km relay at the 1982 FIS Nordic World Ski Championships (Tied with Finland).

Winsch finished 12th in the 15 km event at a 1983 World Cup event in Sarajevo. He also competed at the 1984 Winter Olympics.

Cross-country skiing results
All results are sourced from the International Ski Federation (FIS).

Olympic Games

World Championships
 1 medal – (1 bronze)

World Cup

Season standings

Team podiums
1 podium

Note:  Until the 1999 World Championships, World Championship races were included in the World Cup scoring system.

References

External links

1963 births
Living people
People from Frankenberg, Saxony
East German male cross-country skiers
FIS Nordic World Ski Championships medalists in cross-country skiing
Olympic cross-country skiers of East Germany
Cross-country skiers at the 1984 Winter Olympics
Sportspeople from Saxony